Events from the year 1679 in Sweden

Incumbents
 Monarch – Charles XI

Events
 Treaties of Nijmegen
 19 June - Treaty of Saint-Germain-en-Laye (1679)
 5 February 1679 (NS) / January 26, 1679 (OS) - Treaty of Celle
 16 September (O.S.) / 26 September - The Peace of Lund ends the Scanian War between Denmark-Norway and the Swedish Empire.  
 
 Atlantica (Atland eller Manheim in Swedish) by Olaus Rudbeck, where he purported to prove that Sweden was Atlantis, the cradle of civilization, and Swedish the original language of Adam from which Latin and Hebrew had evolved.

Births

 7 March - Carl Gyllenborg, politician and writer (died 1744) 
 Magnus Bromelius, physician and paleontologist (died 1731)

Deaths

 November - Lisbetha Olsdotter, female soldier and cross dresser (year of birth unknown)

References

 
Years of the 17th century in Sweden
Sweden